Revista de Estudios Políticos (English: Journal of Political Studies) is a peer-reviewed open-access academic journal covering political science, political history, and history of political thought and published by the Centre for Political and Constitutional Studies (Madrid, Spain). The journal was established in 1941.

History and profile
The journal was established by the Institute of Political Studies, a Francoist group, in 1941. It is headquartered in Madrid. In its early period the journal also covered articles about international politics in addition to those on political science, political history, and history of political thought. Its international politics section frequently featured articles related to major developments in the Soviet Union and other communist states.

The journal was published on a quarterly basis until 2021 when it became a print on demand publication. The editor-in-chief is Juan José Solozabal Echavarria (Autonomous University of Madrid).

Abstracting and indexing
The journal is abstracted and indexed in:

According to the Journal Citation Reports, the journal has a 2021 impact factor of 0.377.

References

External links

1941 establishments in Spain
Publications established in 1941
Creative Commons Attribution-licensed journals
Political science journals
Spanish-language journals
Continuous journals